Brunel is a French surname. Notable people with the surname include:

People
Adrian Brunel (1892–1958), English film director and screenwriter
Alfred-Arthur Brunel de Neuville (1852-1941), French painter
Bunny Brunel (born 1950), French-born American bass guitarist 
Chantal Brunel (born 1948), French politician and mayor
Gérard Brunel (born 1957), French hurdler
Jacques Brunel (died 1564), 16th century French organist and composer
Jacques Brunel (rugby player) (born 1954), French rugby union player and coach
Jean-Luc Brunel (1946–2022), French model scout and agency manager
June Brunel or Brunell, Australian actress, June Newton (1923–2021)
Marc Isambard Brunel (1769–1849), engineer and father of Isambard Kingdom Brunel
Isambard Kingdom Brunel (1806–1859), famed British engineer
Henry Marc Brunel (1842-1903), engineer and the second son of Isambard Kingdom Brunel
Olivier Brunel (born 16th century), Flemish merchant and explorer
Philippe Brunel (born 1973), French footballer
Todd Brunel, American clarinetist 
Valentin Brunel (born 1996), French DJ and musician better known as Kungs

Fictional characters
 Colette Brunel, a character in Tales of Symphonia

See also
Brunel (disambiguation)
Brunell

French-language surnames